Xiphodynia or 'Xiphoidalgia’ is thought to be a rare musculoskeletal syndrome that involves referred pain referred from the xiphisternal joint or the structures attached to the xiphoid process.  Digital examination of the xiphoid process reproduces symptoms. Xiphodynia is in fact a relatively common condition which will be missed unless considered in the differentials list. It is caused by inflammation of the junction between the sternum and xiphoid process.

Signs and symptoms

Signs and symptoms of Xiphodynia include:

 Cardiac chest pain
 Abdominal pain
 Nausea, vomiting, and diarrhoea
 Radiating pain into the back, neck, shoulders, arms and chest wall

References

Skeletal system